Gabrán mac Domangairt (Old Welsh: Gawran map Dinwarch) or Gabrán the Traitor (Gwran Wradouc) was king of Dál Riata,in the mid-6th century. He is the eponymous ancestor of the Cenél nGabráin. Gabrán was the son of Domangart Réti.

The historical evidence for Gabrán is limited to the notice of his death in the Irish and Welsh annals. It is possible that Gabrán's death should be linked to a migration or flight from Bridei mac Maelchon, but this may be no more than coincidence.

See also 
 Origins of the Kingdom of Alba
 List of monarchs of Scotland

Notes

References 

 Adomnán of Iona, Life of Saint Columba, tr. & ed. Richard Sharpe. Penguin, London, 1995. 
 Bannerman, John, Studies in the History of Dalriada. Scottish Academic Press, Edinburgh, 1974. 
 Lane, Alan & Campbell, Ewan, Dunadd: An early Dalriadic capital, Oxbow Books, Oxford, 2000. 
 Sharpe, Richard, "The thriving of Dalriada" in Simon Taylor (ed.), Kings, clerics and chronicles in Scotland 500–1297. Four Courts, Dublin, 2000. 

6th-century births
Kings of Dál Riata
6th-century Scottish monarchs
560s deaths
6th-century Irish monarchs